Sadong-guyŏk, or Sadong District, is one of the 18 guyŏk, and one of the six, that constitute East Pyongyang, North Korea.  It is on the eastern bank of the Taedong River, and the mouth of the Nam River.  It is north of Ryŏkp'o-guyŏk (Ryokpho District), east of Taedonggang-guyŏk (Taedonggang District) and north east of Tongdaewŏn-guyŏk. It was established in September 1959.

Administrative divisions
Sadong-guyŏk is divided into 13 tong (neighbourhoods) and 6 ri (villages):

 Changch'ŏn-dong 장천동 (將泉洞) 
 Hyuam-dong 휴암동 (休岩洞) 
 Mirim-dong 미림동 (美林洞) 
 Namsan-dong 남산동 (南山洞) 
 Samgol-dong 삼골동
 Songhwa 1-dong 송화 1동 (松華 1洞) 
 Songhwa 2-dong 송화 2동 (松華 2洞) 
 Songsin 1-dong 송신 1동 (松新 1洞)
 Songsin 2-dong 송신 2동 (松新 2洞) 
 Songsin 3-dong 송신 3동 (松新 3洞) 
 Sŏkchŏng-dong 석정동 (石井洞)
 Turu 1-dong 두루 1동 (豆樓 1洞) 
 Turu 2-dong 두루 2동 (豆樓 2洞)
 Oryu-ri 오류리 (五柳里) 
 Rihyŏl-li 리현리 (梨峴里) 
 Taewŏl-li 대원리 (大園里)
 Tongch'ang-ri 동창리 (東倉里) 
 Tŏktong-ri 덕동리 (德洞里)

Districts of Pyongyang